Abels Bay is a rural locality in the local government area (LGA) of Huon Valley in the South-east LGA region of Tasmania. The  recorded a population of 127 for Abels Bay.

Geography
The western boundary follows the shoreline of Port Cygnet, an inlet of the Huon River estuary.

Road infrastructure 
Route B68 (Channel Highway) runs along the north-eastern boundary. From there, Abels Bay Road provides access to the locality.

References

Towns in Tasmania
Localities of Huon Valley Council